The National Football League has seen a quarterback passer rating of zero posted 136 times.

To achieve a passer rating of zero in a game, a QB must have no touchdowns, complete no more than 30% of his pass attempts, average less than three yards per attempt, throw an interception on at least 9.5% of attempts and attempt at least ten passes.

Terry Bradshaw posted a zero rating on a record three occasions, while eight other QBs have two games of zero; Gary Keithley is the only QB ever to post zero ratings in two straight weeks (1973). 

There have been three occasions where a starting QB, and his mid-game replacement, have both earned a zero rating in the same game: starter Joe Namath and replacement Richard Todd with the New York Jets (1976), starter Vince Evans and replacement Bob Avellini with the Chicago Bears (1981), and starter Terry Bradshaw and replacement Cliff Stoudt with the Pittsburgh Steelers (1982). 

Only once have opposing QBs both posted a zero rating: Gary Keithley and the St. Louis Cardinals defeated Bob Lee and the Atlanta Falcons (1973). No starting QB with a passer rating of zero has won the game since Norm Snead in 1976.

Twelve QBs who had a zero passer rating also earned a perfect (158.3) passer rating during their careers: Otto Graham, Johnny Unitas, Joe Namath, Terry Bradshaw, Len Dawson, Bob Griese, James Harris, Bob Lee, Scott Hunter, Dan Fouts, Craig Morton, Vince Evans, Eli Manning, and Peyton Manning.

The Buffalo Bills have held opposing QBs to a zero passer rating more than any other franchise, having accomplished the feat eight times, as of 2021.

List

See also
List of NFL quarterbacks who have posted a perfect passer rating

References 

Passing rating